Mar  V (sometimes written Elia V) was the patriarch of the Church of the East from September 1502 until his death in 1504.

In April 1503 or 1504, in the monastery of Mar Yohannan the Egyptian near Gazarta, Eliya consecrated three monks from the monastery of Mar Awgin for service in India: the metropolitan bishop Yahballaha and two suffragan bishops, Denha and Yaʿqob. The patriarch sent with them Mar Thomas, who had previously gone to India in 1499. The bishops sent a detailed letter on the situation of the Church of the East in India, but it did not reach Eliya before his death.

Eliya was buried in the church of Mart Meskinta in Mosul.

Wilmhurst argues that, based on the brevity of Eliya's reign and the fact that he was not buried in Rabban Hormizd Monastery (as was the custom for Patriarchs at the time), the legitimacy of his patriarchy may not have been universally recognised by his contemporaries.

Notes

Bibliography

 
 
 
 
 
 
 

1504 deaths
16th-century bishops of the Church of the East
Patriarchs of the Church of the East